No official radio stations broadcast on AM frequency 261 kHz:

Inactive
Germany: Formerly Radio Wolga and Radioropa Info from Burg
Bulgaria: Formerly Radio Horizont
Russia: Formerly Radio Rossii

Proposed
The Burg AM transmitter in Germany to be used by Europe 1 to transmit traffic information.

Unofficial
A station called Radio Luxemburg was heard on 261 kHz in December 2016.

References

Lists of radio stations by frequency

fi:261 kHz